It's All About Amy is a British fly on the wall reality television series based on the life of Amy Childs, her family and friends that began airing on 1 December 2011 on Channel 5 as part of an 8-part series. Channel 5 cancelled It's All About Amy on 26 January 2012 due to low ratings.

Cast

Series

The series takes place in 2011 after Childs has left the Big Brother house and begins investing in many businesses, including her salon. The series also shows Childs as she continues to model and present on television. Childs' mother Julie, father Billy and brother Billy Jr. appear, along with manager Claire Powell. Cousin and The Only Way is Essex regular Harry Derbidge also appears in the series.

Ratings
Episode viewing figures from BARB.

References

External links
It's All About Amy – Channel 5
.
"Amy Childs defends It's All About Amy after disappointing viewing figures". Metro. 6 December 2011.

2011 British television series debuts
2012 British television series endings
2010s British reality television series
Channel 5 (British TV channel) reality television shows
English-language television shows
Reality television spin-offs
The Only Way Is Essex